Ariosa Diagnostics, Inc. v. Sequenom, Inc., 788 F.3d 1371 (Fed. Cir. 2015), was a controversial decision of the Federal Circuit in which the court applied the Mayo v. Prometheus test to invalidate as patent-ineligible a patent said to "solve ... a very practical problem accessing fetal DNA without creating a major health risk for the unborn child." In December 2015, the Federal Circuit denied a motion for en banc rehearing, with several members of the court filing opinions urging Supreme Court review. On June 27, 2016, the Supreme Court of the United States denied Sequenom's petition for a writ of certiorari.

Background

Sequenom is the exclusive licensee of U.S. Patent No. 6,258,540, which claims methods of using cell-free fetal DNA (cffDNA) circulating in maternal plasma (cell-free blood) to diagnose fetal abnormalities. Claim 1 is illustrative:

The point of the invention is that the inventors discovered in 1996 that fetal DNA might be floating around in the mother's blood (not just in the blood of the fetus, which was accessible only by invasive methods, such as amniocentesis, that created risks of miscarriage). Then they realized that they could selectively amplify the fetal DNA by focusing on the paternally inherited portion of its DNA (rather than the maternally inherited DNA).

The claim itself has two simple and conventional steps: first amplifying (by polymerase chain reaction, PCR) and then detecting the paternally inherited DNA from the plasma sample. The technology for amplifying and detecting DNA was already well known and generally used to detect DNA. There was a problem, however, of how to ascertain which DNA in the sample was that of the fetus and which was the mother's (which greatly outnumbered the fetal DNA in the sample).

The inventors realized that the fetus had DNA derived from the father as well as the mother, and that paternal DNA was not native to the mother's blood. So they wanted to focus on genetic fragments containing paternally inherited sequences the mother did not share, but had traveled from the fetal blood into the maternal blood through the placenta. The paternal DNA in the mother's plasma had to have come from the fetus. Then, they could reliably identify fetal DNA, which would in turn allow them to diagnose certain fetal genetic conditions such as Down Syndrome, which can be detected by observing presence of extra chromosomes. The inventors now had a test that did not require amniocentesis, which is invasive and may cause miscarriages. Sequenom became the exclusive licensee of the patent.

After Sequenom launched its test on the market, several other companies began to market similar tests and cut prices. Sequenom sent letters to Ariosa Diagnostics, Inc., Natera, Inc. and Diagnostics Center, Inc.. threatening each of them with patent infringement suits. They responded by filing declaratory judgment actions against Sequenom.

The district court construed the patent and denied a preliminary injunction, and Sequenom took an interlocutory appeal. On remand to the district court, it held the patent invalid as claiming the only viable method of detecting a natural phenomenon. The district court said: "[T]he claims at issue pose a substantial risk of preempting the natural phenomenon of paternally inherited cffDNA," which made them patent-ineligible. Sequenom then appealed to the Federal Circuit.

Ruling of the Federal Circuit

Panel decision

A three-judge panel affirmed the judgment of the district court. The majority concluded that the patent fails the two-step test that the Supreme Court developed in Mayo for determining whether a method patent impermissibly claims a natural law or phenomenon.

First, the court said, the claims "are directed to a patent-ineligible concept" because the "method begins and ends with a natural phenomenon" (i.e., cffDNA). Second, it said, the claimed method did not "'transform' the claimed naturally occurring phenomenon into a patent-eligible application"of the phenomenon.

The court reasoned that, "[f]or process claims that encompass natural phenomen[a], the process steps . . . must be new and useful." But researchers already knew how to accomplish the individual steps of (1) fractionating blood; (2) amplifying DNA; and (3) detecting characteristics in amplified DNA. Therefore, the claimed method impermissibly added only "well-understood, routine, and conventional activity" to the natural phenomenon that the doctor inventors had discovered. That made the claimed subject matter patent-ineligible as a matter of law.

The court said that it rejected Sequenom's argument that "implies that the inventive concept lies in the discovery of cffDNA in plasma or serum." That discovery is the discovery of a natural phenomenon. The court also rejected the argument that the patent did not preempt the entire use of cffDNA and that some uses were unpreempted. While total preemption "may signal patent ineligible subject matter," under Parker v. Flook and other cases "the absence of complete preemption does not demonstrate patent eligibility." The fact that once a court concludes that the claims involve only natural phenomena and "conventional" techniques, "preemption concerns are fully addressed and made moot."

Senior Judge Linn concurred separately, saying that he was "bound by the sweeping language of the test set out in Mayo." He explained also why he considered the Supreme Court's Mayo decision incorrect:

Denial of rehearing en banc

Sequenom sought rehearing en banc, but in December 2015 it was denied. However, several judges who concurred in the denial wrote separately that they disagreed with the sweep of the Supreme Court's Mayo decision that had compelled the result.

Judge Lourie, joined by Judge Moore, argued that Mayo read without qualification, would not only bar the present invention but would mean that "nothing in the physical universe would be patent-eligible," and thus it was "unsound to have a rule that takes inventions of this nature out of the realm of patent-eligibility on grounds that they only claim a natural phenomenon plus conventional steps." Nonetheless, he agreed that Mayo compelled invalidation of this patent.

Judge Dyk wrote that "a problem with Mayo insofar as it concludes that inventive concept cannot come from discovering something new in nature," especially in biological sciences, is undesirable. But he insisted that "any further guidance must come from the Supreme Court, not this court."

Nonetheless, Judge Dyk offered some speculation as to how the Supreme Court might modify Mayo to accommodate biotech inventions. He suggested the possibility of rule that would exclude trolls but would admit pioneer discoveries of natural laws to a limited extent. Dyk said, "The Mayo/Alice framework works well when the abstract idea or law of nature in question is well known and longstanding, as was the situation in Mayo itself." Yet. it may not be appropriate for discoveries of previously unknown laws of nature:

Yet, "undue preemption" remains a major concern—"the fear that others' innovative future applications of the law will be foreclosed." He therefore proposes a special test for natural law cases, keeping in mind the patent ineligibility of E=mc2 and based on a requirement to keep speculator trolls out:

Dyk adds that he recognizes that the problem with the enablement and written description requirements of 35 U.S.C. § 112 is that they do not provide adequate limitations on claim scope. They "generally require only that one or a handful of representative embodiments be described" by the patent applicant, allow speculative prophesies, and thus do "not entirely prevent claims that preempt future applications of the law of nature by others," as he believes his proposal would. Finally, he said, Sequenom's claims would probably fail under the proposed test. because Sequenom claimed more than it taught: "any diagnosis of any disease, disorder, or condition. . . . impermissible attempts to capture the entire natural phenomenon of cffDNA rather than any particular applications thereof developed and actually reduced to practice by the inventors." Therefore, a future case would be a better vehicle for Supreme Court exposition of the limited, newly discovered natural law aspect of "the Mayo/Alice framework."

Judge Newman alone dissented; in her view the claimed methods were patent eligible even under Mayo because they represent "new applications" of knowledge and not a patent on the knowledge itself.

Certiorari petition

On March 21, 2016, Sequenom filed a certiorari petition. The petition raises one question only:

On June 27, 2016, the Supreme Court of the United States denied the petition for a writ of certiorari.

Commentary

Chris Holman says that the Federal Circuit's opinion "is indeed very bad news for the patenting of diagnostic methods, and in the life sciences generally." Holman said that he hoped that "the Federal Circuit can find some way to rein in the unnecessarily expansive language of Mayo." But if the Federal Circuit is as constrained by Mayo as is believed perhaps only Congress can come to the rescue,

Kevin Noonan, a biotech blogger, considered the decision a "disaster." He blames the assertedly disastrous result on the Federal Circuit's failure to "consider the claim as a whole," instead of which he says it "has broken its analysis into pieces (contrary to Supreme Court's Diamond v. Diehr decision)." He also blames the Federal Circuit for relying on the Supreme Court's decision in Parker v. Flook, as to which he says: "The applicability of that decision on life science inventions should have been firmly put to bed in Judge Rich's In re Bergy decision.

Noonan's point about considering the whole apparently focuses on the fact that the named inventors were the first to discover the natural phenomenon that paternally derived fetal DNA passes into the maternal bloodstream and can be detected there. Although the discovery itself cannot be claimed, and the elements of the claimed diagnostic method applying the discovery are themselves well known in the art, Noonan believes that the meritoriousness of the discovery should be considered when deciding the patent eligibility of the diagnostic method.

Noonan concedes that the type of analysis described in Flook "may make sense in claims to" electromechanical inventions such as that in Flook but not in regard to biotech inventions.

Noonan closes with a blast at the Federal Circuit for a lack of courage or will to use available "analytical and doctrinal tools" to instruct the Supreme Court on correcting its past errors, because "shielding the Court from the consequences of their bad decisions does them a disservice."

Devlin Hartline maintains:

Sue Nym, a pseudonymous biotech blogger, deplores the state of patent-eligibility jurisprudence: "Seemingly every new court decision addressing subject matter eligibility under 35 U.S.C. § 101 progressively weakens the patent system, especially in the life sciences. And each case seems to present a new low in terms of the depth and quality of analysis." She sees a common thread in these decisions, typified in Ariosa v. Sequenom – judicial hostility to patents:

Biotech blogger Courtenay Brinckerhoff considers Judge Dyk's proposals to allow claims to what is actually reduced to practice and no more hopeful prophesies. She questions whether patents limited to what inventors actually reduce to practice and disclose in their patent applications would "adequately promote the fundamental policies underlying the patent system," and she asks:

If not, she says, Dyk's test would just be too complicated and would discourage innovation.

Patent Publius, associated in an undisclosed manner with George Mason University Law School, asserts:

Publius complains further that the Federal Circuit fails to address Sequenom's central argument: "The claimed method is a new process of detecting cffDNA by devising a novel sample source from which to extract it, namely, maternal plasma or serum. The application and adaptation of known techniques in this inventive way to a newly-discovered sample source is not conventional."

He concludes with a warning of still worse things to come:

Jason Rantanan applauds Judge Dyk's concurring opinion on denial of rehearing. According to Professor Rantanon, the Dyk opinion "hits the nail on the head" by "framing the patent eligible subject matter issue as an issue of claim breadth." Rantanon agrees with Dyk that "Section 112(a) doesn't do an adequate job, by itself, of limiting claim breadth," so that it is necessary, as Dyk does, to "articulate a conceptually coherent approach to patentable subject matter in the context of discoveries of natural laws, one that allows for valid claims in this space but which still imposes limits on what can be claimed."

References

External links
 

2015 in United States case law
United States patent case law
United States biotechnology case law